Dayaraya Xavier Koodapuzha Ramban  Professor Emeritus of Paurastya Vidhya Peedam was born on 28 February 1934 in Chenapady, Kanjirappally. His parents are Joseph Chacko and Annamma Koodapuzha. After completing his primary schooling, he did his tertiary studies at the St. Berchmans College in Changanacherry. He joined Parel St. Thomas Seminary in the year 1951 and did priestly studies at the Propaganda Fide College in Rome. He received a doctorate in theology and a master's degree in philosophy from the Urban University in Rome and masters degrees in Oriental sciences and Oriental canon law from the Pontifical Oriental Institute in Rome. He is a church historian and a scholar. He is a notable contributor to the Catholic Church.

He currently leads a monastic life in Mar Thoma Sleeha Dehra.

Positions
He has served as the

 Asst Parish Priest: St Mary's Cathedral, Changanacherry
 Parish Priest: St Dominic's Cathedral, Kanjirapally
 Manager: St Dominic's College and H S School, Kanjirapally
 Principal of Missionary Orientation Centre, Manganam
 Vice President, Paurastya Vidyapitham, Vadavathoor
 Dean of Studies St Thomas Apost. Seminary, Vadavathoor
 President of Eastern Theological Association of India
 Manager of St Dominic's College, Kanjirapally
 Secretary & Treasurer of Peerumedu Development Society

Founder of 

 Missionary Orientation Centre at Kottayam
  Oriental Institute of India Publications (OIRSI) and was its  Director from the beginning in 1977 up to 1999.
 Mar Thoma Sleeha Monastery for Men at Nallathanny, the first of its kind in the Syro-Malabar  Church.

Other Contributions

 Founder and Managing Editor: Liturgical Monthly "Dukrana"
 Founder and Section Editor of Christian Orient
 Section Editor of Christian Orient and Jeevadhara.
 Priest Advisor of CRI (Women) Conference of the Religious of India, Kottayam Reg.
Unit
 Member of the Roman International Commission of dialogue between the Roman Catholic Church and the Malankara Orthodox Syrian Churches in India
 Member of the Roman International Commission of dialogue between the Roman Catholic Church and the Malankara Syrian Jacobite Churches in India

Professor at Paurastya Vidyapitham for 35 years
He has been Professor of Theology, Oriental Sciences, History and Ecclesiology at the Pontifical Oriental Institute, Kottayam

Visiting Professor
At the theological Faculties of Poona (JDV), Delhi (Vidyajyoti), Bangalore (Redemptorists) and Alwaye (St Joseph's Pont. Institute).

He has been a Catholic delegate of the two Roman Ecumenical Commissions for Dialogue with the Orthodox Churches in India. He has published seventeen books in English and Malayalam and has received for Awards for his outstanding contribution in the field of History and Theology.

Papers at the International Conferences
 International Conference of  Canonists Boston USA
 International Conference of  Catholic and Orthodox Churches, Vienna, Austria
 International Conference at Chicago, USA

Some of his most Famous Works Published

(1).Faith and Communion of the Indian Church of Thomas Christians
(2).Oriental Churches: An Introduction
(3).Christianity in India
(4).Communion of Churches (ed)
(5).Eastern Theological Reflections (ed)
(6).Papers and Joint Statements of the Joint International Commission for Dialogue
Between the Catholic Church and the Malankara Orthodox Syrian Church (ed)
(7).Canonical Sources of the Syro-Malabar Churches, Placid J. Podipara, (ed)
(8).Oriental Churches: Theological Dimensions (ed.)
(9).Ecclesial Identity of the Thomas Christians (Joint ed)
(10).Indian Church History (Malayalam)
(11).History of the Catholic Church (Malayalam)
(12).Sabhavijnaniyam (Malayalam)

Winner of Awards
AKCC AWARD for the best book on History of the Church
CANA AWARD for the best book on the History of Christianity in India
MARTHOMA PURASKARAM for the contribution for the promotion of the heritage of the  St Thomas Christians
ARANCHERRY AWARD for the contribution in the study of the traditions of the St. Thomas Christians

References

Sources
http://www.kanjirappally.com/html/pilgrim%20centres.htm

1934 births
Living people
20th-century Indian Roman Catholic theologians
Syro-Malabar priests
Pontifical Urban University alumni
Pontifical Oriental Institute alumni